Korstiaan "Kees" Verkade (12 October 1941 – 29 December 2020) was a Dutch artist and sculptor. He specialized in modeling the human form, with an emphasis on movement and emotion. Most of his sculptures are set in bronze. They depict a variety of people, including children, clowns, athletes, dancers, mothers, and lovers. Verkade also created gouaches and silkscreens to accompany his sculptures.

Biography

Early life
Kees Verkade was born on 12 October 1941 in Haarlem. He wished to attend the Gerrit Rietveld Academie but was rejected. He took painting lessons with Gerrit van ’t Net from 1958 to 1963, and from Dirk Bus at the Royal Academy of Art, The Hague. He graduated from the Academy in 1963.

Career
In 1964, he had his first exposition in the Haarlem Vleeshal (the former municipal meat market), now belonging to the Frans Hals Museum. This was a success and the Frans Hals Museum bought two of his sculptures. He specialised in carving and sculpture. In 1966 he sold his first public work Winkelen to the municipality of Haarlem in 1966. His big breakthrough came three years later when American photographer David Douglas Duncan bought several of his bronze statues and showed them to his friends. Verkade then proceeded to become an internationally recognized artist, and many local associations bought his work. His work can be seen in public places around Haarlem and Zandvoort, where he lived and worked.

In 2013, he did a public sculpture of the late Rainier III, Prince of Monaco (1923–2005), which stands outside the Prince's Palace of Monaco.

Personal life
He moved to Monaco in the late 1970's. In 1979 he married baroness Ludmila von Falz-Fein. He died there on 29 December 2020, aged 79.

Selected works
 H.S.H. Princess Grace of Monaco (1983) in the Princess Grace Rose Garden, in Fontvieille, Monaco
 Triomf (1995) in Rotterdam, Netherlands
 Malizia (1997) a statue of François Grimaldi in Monaco
 Tightrope Walker (1979), Columbia University, New York City

References

External links
 keesverkade.com
 at kunstbus.nl
 KEES VERKADE Unique, Distinguishing and Always in Development

1941 births
2020 deaths
Artists from Haarlem
Dutch expatriates in Monaco
Dutch sculptors
Dutch male sculptors
Monegasque sculptors
Royal Academy of Art, The Hague alumni